The Isay reaction also known as Gabriel-Isay condensation is an organic reaction in which certain diaminopyrimidines are transformed into pterins by condensation with a 1,2-dicarbonyl compound, such as 2,3-butanedione. The reaction is named after Oskar Isay.

See also
List of organic reactions

References

Name reactions
Nitrogen heterocycle forming reactions